Zadonsky (masculine), Zadonskaya (feminine), or Zadonskoye (neuter) is the name of several rural localities in Rostov Oblast, Russia:
Zadonsky, Azovsky District, Rostov Oblast, a khutor in Zadonskoye Rural Settlement of Azovsky District
Zadonsky, Bagayevsky District, Rostov Oblast, a settlement in Bagayevskoye Rural Settlement of Bagayevsky District